Brian Morton (born 1 January 1970) is an Australian sprint canoeist who competed from the mid-1990s to the early 2000s (decade). He competed in four World Sprint Canoe Championships 1995–1999 and two Summer Olympics; Atlanta 1996 and Sydney 2000. He earned his best finish of third in the Men's K-4 1000m event in the 1997 World Sprint Canoe Championships in Nova Scotia, Canada. His best Olympic placing was ninth in the K-4 1000 m event at Atlanta in 1996.

References

External links
Sports-Reference.com profile
Brian Morton at the Australian Olympic Committee

1970 births
Australian male canoeists
Canoeists at the 1996 Summer Olympics
Canoeists at the 2000 Summer Olympics
Living people
Olympic canoeists of Australia
20th-century Australian people